Ramiro Fermin (born 20 March 1940) is a Dutch Antillean weightlifter. He competed in the men's middle heavyweight event at the 1960 Summer Olympics.

References

1940 births
Living people
Dutch Antillean male weightlifters
Olympic weightlifters of the Netherlands Antilles
Weightlifters at the 1960 Summer Olympics
Place of birth missing (living people)